Silver fir is a common name for several trees and may refer to:

Abies alba, native to Europe
Abies amabilis, native to western North America
Abies pindrow, native to Asia